The Sun Odyssey 45 DS (Deck Saloon) is a French sailboat that was designed by Philippe Briand as a blue water cruiser and first built in 2007.

Production
The design was built by Jeanneau in France, starting in 2007, but it is now out of production.

Design
The Sun Odyssey 45 DS is a recreational keelboat, built predominantly of fiberglass. It has a 9/10 fractional sloop rig, a nearly plumb stem, a reverse transom with steps and a swimming platform, an internally mounted spade-type rudder controlled by dual wheels and a fixed deep draft fin keel with a weighted bulb or optional shoal-draft keel. The deep draft fin keel model displaces  and carries  of ballast, while the shoal draft version displaces  and carries  of ballast.

The design has sleeping accommodation for six people, with a double "V"-berth in the bow cabin, a "U"-shaped settee and a straight settee in the main cabin and two aft cabins, each with a double berth. The galley is located on the starboard side at the companionway ladder. The galley is "L"-shaped and is equipped with a four-burner stove, an ice box and a double sink. A navigation station is opposite the galley, on the port side. There are two heads, one in the bow cabin on the starboard side and one on the port, aft. A two cabin interior was a factory option with the two aft cabins combined into one larger cabin.

Operational history
In a 2015 review for Yachting Monthly, Theo Stocker wrote, "in light conditions and off the wind she handles like a much smaller boat than she is. She is a high-volume cruiser with ample space to live aboard, but this entails some sacrifice in her handling of stronger wind. Weight has been kept down to keep her light and responsive and her good form stability compensates for this, but with a ballast displacement ratio of just under 30 per cent, she can be tender once a blow gets up. This isn't a problem as long as you reef early and sail her reasonably flat."

See also
List of sailing boat types

References

External links

Keelboats
2000s sailboat type designs
Sailing yachts
Sailboat type designs by Philippe Briand
Sailboat types built by Jeanneau